Australian Baptist Ministries (formerly Baptist Union of Australia) is the oldest and largest national cooperative body of Baptists in Australia. The Baptist Union of Australia was inaugurated on 24 August 1926 at the Burton Street Church in Sydney. The headquarters is in Belmont. It is affiliated with the Baptist World Alliance.

History

Baptist work in Australia began in Sydney in 1831, forty-three years after the British penal colony was established. The first preacher was John McKaeg, who conducted the first Baptist service on Sunday 24 April in The Rose and Crown Inn on the corner of Castlereagh and King Streets. The first baptism, of two female congregants, was conducted by McKaeg in Woolloomooloo Bay on 12 August 1832.

It was not until 1835 that the first church was established in Hobart Town by Henry Dowling, a strict Calvinist. John Saunders, who had been sent by the Baptist Missionary Society of England to Sydney in 1834, raised the funding to erect a second church which was opened on 23 September 1836. The first state Union was formed in Victoria in 1862. The national Baptist Union was founded in 1926 by representatives from existing state unions. In 2009 it was renamed Australian Baptist Ministries.

Statistics 
According to a denomination census released in 2022, it claimed 1,031 churches and 88,756 members.

Affiliations
Australian Baptist Ministries is a member of the Asia Pacific Baptist Federation (formerly Asian Baptist Federation) and the Baptist World Alliance. Ministry arms of ABM include Baptist Mission Australia (formerly known as the Australian Baptist Missionary Society and then as Global Interaction), Australian Baptist World Aid, Baptist Care, and a number of Delegated Bodies which represent communities of practice, developing strategies and resources that benefit the Australian Baptist movement. These include: Crossover Australia, and Crossover Remote (formerly Northreach). The national work is divided among one territory and six state unions, which operate independently, with the national body functioning as a governance council to facilitate collaborative ministries and mission initiatives across the Baptist movement in Australia.

Schools
It has 3 affiliated theological institutes.

References

From Woolloomooloo to 'Eternity': A History of Australian Baptists by Ken R. Manley (Paternoster, 2006, 2 volumes,  & )
Baptists Around the World, by Albert W. Wardin, Jr.

External links
Australian Baptist Ministries - official Web Site
Baptists in Australia - a short history of Baptists in Australia
Baptist World Aid Australia

Christian organizations established in 1926
Christian denominations in Australia
Baptist denominations in Oceania
Baptist denominations established in the 20th century
1926 establishments in Australia
Baptist Christianity in Australia